This is a list of municipalities in the Netherlands which have standing links to local communities in other countries. In most cases, the association, especially when formalised by local government, is known as "town twinning" (usually in Europe) or "sister cities" (usually in the rest of the world).

A
Alkmaar

 Bath, England, United Kingdom
 Bergama, Turkey
 Darmstadt, Germany
 Tata, Hungary
 Troyes, France

Almelo

 Denizli, Turkey
 Iserlohn, Germany
 Preston, England, United Kingdom

Almere

 Aalborg, Denmark
 Rendsburg, Germany
 Shenzhen, China
 Växjö, Sweden

Alphen aan den Rijn
 Oudtshoorn, South Africa

Ameland
 Kleve, Germany

Amersfoort terminated all its twinnings.

Amstelveen

 Tempelhof-Schöneberg (Berlin), Germany
 Villa El Salvador, Peru

Apeldoorn

 Burlington, Canada
 Charlottenburg-Wilmersdorf (Berlin), Germany
 Gagny, France

Appingedam
 Aurich, Germany

Arnhem

 Coventry, England, United Kingdom
 Croydon, England, United Kingdom
 Gera, Germany
 Hradec Králové, Czech Republic
 Kimberley, South Africa
 Villa El Salvador, Peru

Assen
 Poznań, Poland

B
Baarn terminated all its twinnings.

Barendrecht
 Louny, Czech Republic

Beek
 Gundelfingen an der Donau, Germany

Beemster
 Studená, Czech Republic

Bergen op Zoom

 Oudenaarde, Belgium
 Szczecinek, Poland

Beuningen
 Mikołów, Poland

Beverwijk
 Wronki, Poland

Borne
 Rheine, Germany

Breda

 Diest, Belgium
 Dillenburg, Germany
 Orange, France
 Wrocław, Poland
 Yangzhou, China

Brielle
 Havlíčkův Brod, Czech Republic

Brunssum
 Alsdorf, Germany

Buren
 Kinderhook, United States

C
Coevorden

 Brest, Belarus
 Nordhorn, Germany

D
De Bilt

 Coesfeld, Germany
 Mieścisko, Poland

De Fryske Marren

 Drolshagen, Germany
 Mediaș, Romania

Delft

 Estelí, Nicaragua
 Freiberg, Germany
 Kfar Saba, Israel

Delfzijl
 Shūnan, Japan

Den Helder
 Lüdenscheid, Germany

Deventer

 Arnsberg, Germany
 Sibiu, Romania
 Tartu, Estonia

Doetinchem

 La Libertad, Nicaragua
 Pardubice, Czech Republic
 Raesfeld, Germany

Dordrecht

 Bamenda, Cameroon
 Dordrecht, South Africa
 Hastings, England, United Kingdom
 Recklinghausen, Germany
 Varna, Bulgaria

Duiven

 Calafat, Romania
 Gemünden am Main, Germany

E
Eindhoven

 Bayeux, France
 Białystok, Poland
 Chinandega, Nicaragua
 Kadoma, Japan
 Minsk, Belarus
 Nanjing, China

Emmen

 Georgsmarienhütte, Germany
 Shangluo, China

Enschede

 Dalian, China
 Münster, Germany
 Palo Alto, United States

Etten-Leur
 Šiauliai, Lithuania

G
Gennep
 San Pedro de Lóvago, Nicaragua

Goes
 Panevėžys, Lithuania

Goirle
 Krasnogorsk, Russia

Gooise Meren

 Uherský Brod, Czech Republic
 Valašské Meziříčí, Czech Republic

Gorinchem

 Gangjin, South Korea
 Sint-Niklaas, Belgium

Gouda

 Kongsberg, Norway
 Solingen, Germany

Groningen

 Graz, Austria
 Hamburg, Germany
 Kaliningrad, Russia
 Katowice, Poland
 Murmansk, Russia
 Newcastle upon Tyne, England, United Kingdom
 Odense, Denmark
 Oldenburg, Germany
 San Carlos, Nicaragua
 Tallinn, Estonia
 Tianjin, China
 Xi'an, China
 Zlín, Czech Republic

H
Haaksbergen

 Ahaus, Germany
 Nagykőrös, Hungary

Haaren
 Pobiedziska, Poland

Haaren – Esch is a member of the Charter of European Rural Communities, a town twinning association across the European Union, alongside with:

 Bienvenida, Spain
 Bièvre, Belgium
 Bucine, Italy
 Cashel, Ireland
 Cissé, France
 Desborough, England, United Kingdom
 Hepstedt, Germany
 Ibănești, Romania
 Kandava (Tukums), Latvia
 Kannus, Finland
 Kolindros, Greece
 Lassee, Austria
 Medzev, Slovakia
 Moravče, Slovenia
 Næstved, Denmark
 Nagycenk, Hungary
 Nadur, Malta
 Ockelbo, Sweden
 Pano Lefkara, Cyprus
 Põlva, Estonia
 Samuel (Soure), Portugal
 Slivo Pole, Bulgaria
 Starý Poddvorov, Czech Republic
 Strzyżów, Poland
 Tisno, Croatia
 Troisvierges, Luxembourg
 Žagarė (Joniškis), Lithuania

Haarlem

 Angers, France
 Harlem (New York), United States
 Osnabrück, Germany

Haarlemmermeer
 Cebu City, Philippines

Hattem
 Püspökladány, Hungary

Heemstede
 Royal Leamington Spa, England, United Kingdom

Heerhugowaard

 Goyang, South Korea
 Kalisz, Poland

Hellendoorn
 Ibbenbüren, Germany

Helmond

 Mechelen, Belgium
 San Marcos, Nicaragua
 Zielona Góra, Poland

Hengelo

 Emsdetten, Germany
 Ogre, Latvia

's-Hertogenbosch

 Leuven, Belgium
 Trier, Germany

Hof van Twente
 Keszthely, Hungary

Hoogeveen
 Martin, Slovakia

Hoorn

 Malacca City, Malaysia
 Příbram, Czech Republic

Hulst
 Michelstadt, Germany

I
IJsselstein
 Herentals, Belgium

K
Kampen

 Eilat, Israel
 Meinerzhagen, Germany
 Pápa, Hungary
 Soest, Germany

Kapelle
 Orry-la-Ville, France

Katwijk
 Siegen, Germany

Koggenland
 Oberursel, Germany

Krimpen aan den IJssel

 Kiskőrös, Hungary
 Kościan, Poland

L
Landgraaf

 Andrychów, Poland
 Übach-Palenberg, Germany

Landsmeer

 Bergneustadt, Germany
 Châtenay-Malabry, France

Leiden

 Buffalo City, South Africa
 Juigalpa, Nicaragua
 Krefeld, Germany
 Nagasaki, Japan
 Oxford, England, United Kingdom
 Toruń, Poland

Leidschendam-Voorburg

 Hranice, Czech Republic
 Konstancin-Jeziorna, Poland

Leusden terminated all its twinnings.

Lisse
 Tonami, Japan

Lopik

 Grebenstein, Germany
 Lezoux, France
 Sarsina, Italy

M
Maassluis

 Berehove, Ukraine
 Hatvan, Hungary
 Târgu Secuiesc, Romania

Maastricht

 Chengdu, China
 El Rama, Nicaragua

Meerssen is a member of the Douzelage, a town twinning association of towns across the European Union, alongside with:

 Agros, Cyprus
 Altea, Spain
 Asikkala, Finland
 Bad Kötzting, Germany
 Bellagio, Italy
 Bundoran, Ireland
 Chojna, Poland
 Granville, France
 Holstebro, Denmark
 Houffalize, Belgium
 Judenburg, Austria
 Kőszeg, Hungary
 Marsaskala, Malta
 Niederanven, Luxembourg
 Oxelösund, Sweden
 Preveza, Greece
 Rokiškis, Lithuania
 Rovinj, Croatia
 Sesimbra, Portugal
 Sherborne, England, United Kingdom
 Sigulda, Latvia
 Siret, Romania
 Škofja Loka, Slovenia
 Sušice, Czech Republic
 Tryavna, Bulgaria
 Türi, Estonia
 Zvolen, Slovakia

Meppel
 Most, Czech Republic

Middelburg
 Vilvoorde, Belgium

Mook en Middelaar
 Přibyslav, Czech Republic

N
Nieuwegein
 Rundu, Namibia

Nijkerk
 Schenectady, United States

Nijmegen

 Albany, United States
 Masaya, Nicaragua
 Pskov, Russia

Nissewaard

 Hürth, Germany
 Thetford, England, United Kingdom

Noordenveld

 Litomyšl, Czech Republic
 Sögel, Germany
 Tarnowo Podgórne, Poland

O
Oirschot

 Damasławek, Poland
 Westerlo, Belgium

Oldenzaal
 Rheda-Wiedenbrück, Germany

Opsterland

 Beit Sahour, Palestine
 Ra'anana, Israel

R
Renkum
 Dębno, Poland

Rijssen-Holten

 Steinfurt, Germany
 Winterberg, Germany

Roermond

 Mönchengladbach, Germany
 Nepomuk, Czech Republic

Rotterdam

 Baltimore, United States
 Burgas, Bulgaria
 Cologne, Germany
 Constanța, Romania
 Esch-sur-Alzette, Luxembourg
 Gdańsk, Poland
 Havana, Cuba
 Lille, France
 Liège, Belgium
 Shanghai, China
 Saint Petersburg, Russia
 Turin, Italy

S
Schiedam

 Esslingen am Neckar, Germany
 Neath Port Talbot, Wales, United Kingdom
 Udine, Italy
 Velenje, Slovenia
 Vienne, France

Sliedrecht
 Orăștie, Romania

Sittard-Geleen

 Böblingen, Germany
 Nauheim, Germany
 Pontoise, France

Smallingerland
 Kiryat Ono, Israel

Soest
 Soest, Germany

Stadskanaal
 Lilienthal, Germany

T
Tholen
 Iława, Poland

Tilburg

 Changzhou, China
 Lublin, Poland
 Matagalpa, Nicaragua
 Minamiashigara, Japan
 Same, Tanzania

U
Uden
 Lippstadt, Germany

Utrecht terminated all its twinnings.

V
Veenendaal
 Olomouc, Czech Republic

Venlo
 Krefeld, Germany

Vijfheerenlanden
 Pfinztal, Germany

Vlaardingen
 Moravská Třebová, Czech Republic

Vlissingen
 Ambon, Indonesia

W
Waalwijk
 Unna, Germany

Wageningen

 Gödöllő, Hungary 
 Mörfelden-Walldorf, Germany
 Ndiza, Rwanda
 Zhangzhou, China

Westerveld
 Polička, Czech Republic

Westerwolde

 Andrésy, France
 Haren, Germany
 Międzyrzecz, Poland 
 Nowogród Bobrzański, Poland 
 Rhede, Germany

Wijchen
 Stargard, Poland

Woerden
 Steinhagen, Germany

Z
Zaanstad

 Anderlecht, Belgium
 Boulogne-Billancourt, France
 Hammersmith and Fulham, England, United Kingdom
 Neukölln (Berlin), Germany
 Zwickau, Germany

Zeist

 Berkane, Morocco
 Slavkov u Brna, Czech Republic
 Yamada, Japan

Zevenaar

 Mátészalka, Hungary
 Weilburg, Germany

Zundert
 Auvers-sur-Oise, France

Zutphen terminated all its twinnings.

Zwijndrecht
 Norderstedt, Germany

Zwolle
 Lünen, Germany

References

Netherlands
Twin towns
Foreign relations of the Netherlands
Populated places in the Netherlands
Cities in the Netherlands
Twin towns and sister cities